Hypnosis Mic: Division Rap Battle is a Japanese multimedia series produced by King Records under their label Evil Line Records, centering on fictional rap groups representing various parts of Japan. Since the franchise's debut, the series has released 11 studion albums and 4 singles.

Studio albums

Singles

Other charted songs

References

External links
  

Discographies of Japanese artists
Anime soundtracks